"Your Memory Wins Again" is a debut song co-written and recorded by American country music artist Skip Ewing.  It was released in March 1988 as the first single from the album The Coast of Colorado.  The song reached #17 on the Billboard Hot Country Singles & Tracks chart.  Ewing wrote the song with Mike Geiger and Woody Mullis.

Chart performance

References

1988 debut singles
1988 songs
Skip Ewing songs
Songs written by Skip Ewing
Song recordings produced by Jimmy Bowen
MCA Records singles
Songs written by Mike Geiger
Songs written by Woody Mullis